The first cabinet formed by Hussein Sirri Pasha was one of the governments during the reign of King Farouk. The cabinet lasted from November 1940 to February 1942. It succeeded the cabinet of Hassan Sabry Pasha who suddenly died on 15 November while delivering a speech on behalf of the King at the opening session of the Chamber of Deputies.

Cabinet members
Eight cabinet members, including Prime Minister Hussein Sirri Pasha, served in the previous cabinet led by Hassan Sabry Pasha. Two major political parties of the period, namely the Saadist Institutional Party and the Wafd Party did not take part in the cabinet. There were six independent politicians in the cabinet, and one of them was the Prime Minister. Five ministers were the members of the Liberal Constitutional Party, and one was a member of the Shaabist Party.

List of ministers
The cabinet members were as follows:

Reshuffles
Throughout its term the cabinet saw three shuffles. On 5 June 1941 a crisis led to the resignation of the cabinet members, but it was solved following a minor reshuffle. The last reshuffle occurred on 31 July 1941 and was the most comprehensive one.

Crisis and resignation
The cabinet was dissolved in early February 1942 when the British gave the King an ultimatum to strengthen the Anglo-Egyptian Treaty dated 1936. The British also demanded that diplomatic relations with Vichy France should be reduced. Upon these events King Farouk asked Prime Minister Hussein Sirri Pasha to fire the minister of foreign affairs, Salib Sami Pasha. Sirri Pasha did not accept this demand of the King and resigned from office on 1 February. It was replaced by the cabinet led by Mostafa Al Nahas on 5 February.

References

1940 establishments in Egypt
1942 disestablishments in Egypt
Sirri
Cabinets established in 1940
Cabinets disestablished in 1942